Ragheed Aziz Ganni, Syriac: ܪܓܝܕ ܥܙܝܙ ܓܢܝ (January 20, 1972 – 3 June 2007) was an Iraqi Chaldean Catholic priest. On 3 June 2007, Trinity Sunday, the Sunday after Pentecost, he was killed along with three subdeacons including his cousin Basman Yousef Daud, Wahid Hanna Isho, and Gassan Isam Bidawed in front of Mosul's Holy Spirit Chaldean Church, where he was a parish priest.

Biography
Ragheed Aziz Ganni was born on 20 January 1972 in the predominantly Sunni city of Mosul, Iraq.

After completing a degree in Civil Engineering at Mosul University in 1996 and fulfilling obligatory military service under the Saddam Hussein regime Ganni entered the seminary in Iraq.  In 1996 Ganni's bishop sent him to Rome for further study at the Pontifical University of St. Thomas Aquinas Angelicum where he completed a licentiate in ecumenical theology in 2003.  He was ordained a priest in Rome on 13 October 2001 at the Pontifical Urbaniana University.

During his study in Rome he resided at the Pontifical Irish College where he played soccer for the College.  The annual showcase 5-a-side tournament played in May among the Scots, English, Beda and Irish Colleges has been named the "Ragheed Cup" in his memory.

Ganni celebrated his first Mass in the Chapel at the Irish College.  Today Ganni is one of the nine figures represented in the apse of that chapel where the relics of Saint Oliver Plunkett rest in the altar wrapped in the priestly stole of Ganni. Ganni regularly offered Mass for the Lay Centre at Foyer Unitas which was at the time housed on the grounds of the Irish College.

Fluent in Aramaic, Arabic, Italian, French, and English, Ganni served as a correspondent for the international agency Asia News of the Pontifical Institute for Foreign Missions.

Ganni was finishing his degree in Rome when the Iraq war broke out.  Ganni had received permission from his bishop to return to the Angelicum in Rome to work on a doctorate in ecumenism. In a prewar interview he expressed his opposition to the invasion of Iraqi fearing that Iraqi Christians would be targeted and persecuted.  He looked forward to returning to his native land to serve the Church and people there. He did so after Saddam Hussein was ousted from power in 2003.

Death

On June 3, 2007, Ganni had just finished celebrating the Sunday evening Holy Qurbana and three deacons had recently decided to accompany Ganni because of threats against his life. After the liturgy, he was walking away from the church with Daud as Isho, Bidawed, and Isho's wife followed by car; the group was stopped by unknown armed men. One of the gunmen shouted at Ganni that he had warned him to close the church and demanded to know why he didn't do it. Ganni replied asking "How can I close the house of God?" The gunmen ordered the woman to flee.  Then after the gunmen demanded that the four men convert to Islam and they refused, the four were shot down. The car was then set with explosives to deter interference and so that the bodies would remain abandoned. Several hours passed until a police bomb-squad defused the devices, allowing corpses to be recovered.

Thousands of people attended the funeral of the four men in Karemlash, Iraq on 4 June 2007. Ganni was secretary to Paulos Faraj Rahho, the Archbishop of Mosul of the Chaldean Church, Iraq's largest Christian community. Rahho was murdered only nine months after Ganni's death, in the same city of Mosul.

Legacy 
The Vatican Secretary of State Tarcisio Bertone telegrammed Ragheed's bishop on behalf of Pope Benedict XVI saying that "Ragheed's sacrifice will inspire in the hearts of all men and women of good will a renewed resolve to reject the ways of hatred and violence, to conquer evil with good and to cooperate in hastening the dawn of reconciliation, justice and peace in Iraq."

The Congregation for the Causes of Saints has opened Ganni's cause for sainthood, and declared him a Servant of God.

See also

Christian martyrs
Persecution of Christians

Notes

References
FIDES Catholic News Service

External links
Letter to Fr. Ragheed from a Muslim Friend
Remembrance page at Pontifical Irish College
Obituary in the Independent

1972 births
2007 deaths
Iraqi Assyrian people
Martyred Roman Catholic priests
Iraqi priests
Chaldean Catholics
People from Mosul
Persecution of Christians in Iraq
Pontifical Irish College alumni
21st-century Roman Catholic martyrs
21st-century venerated Christians
Servants of God
Christians executed for refusing to convert to Islam
Pontifical University of Saint Thomas Aquinas alumni